The 1939 USC Trojans football team was an American football team that represented the University of Southern California (USC) in the Pacific Coast Conference (PCC) during the 1939 college football season.  In their 15th year under head coach Howard Jones, the Trojans compiled an 8–0–2 record (5–0–2 against PCC opponents), shut out six of ten opponents, won the PCC championship, and outscored all opponents by a total of 181 to 33. They won the PCC championship.

In the final AP poll released on December 9, 1939, USC was ranked No. 3 with 891 points, 200 points behind No 1 Texas A&M. However, in the Dickinson System rankings released three days later on December 12, USC was ranked No. 1 with a 25.73 point rating, edging out Texas A&M by three tenths of a point.

After the final AP poll was released, the Trojans defeated No. 2 Tennessee, 14–0, in the 1940 Rose Bowl. Tennessee had not given up any points prior to the Rose Bowl and had won 23 consecutive games. The AP did not conduct a poll after the bowl games.

USC guard Harry Smith was a consensus first-team pick on the 1939 All-America college football team. Smith was later inducted into the College Football Hall of Fame. Quarterback Grenny Lansdell was chosen as a first-team All-American by the Central Press Association and as a third-team All-American by the Associated Press. Smith, Lansdell, and tackle Phil Gaspar were also selected as first-team players on the 1939 All-Pacific Coast football team.

USC recognized the 1939 team as National Champions in 2004 based on their #1 ranking in the contemporary Dickinson System. USC saluted the surviving members of the squad on the field at their October 16 home game versus Arizona State.

Schedule

1940 NFL Draft
The following players were drafted into professional football following the 1939 season.

References

USC
USC Trojans football seasons
Pac-12 Conference football champion seasons
Rose Bowl champion seasons
College football undefeated seasons
USC Trojans football